Cenate Sopra is a comune (municipality) in the Province of Bergamo in the Italian region of Lombardy, located about  northeast of Milan and about  east of Bergamo.

The municipality of Cenate Sopra contains the frazioni (subdivisions, mainly villages and hamlets) Sant'Ambrogio, Valpredina, and Piazze.

Cenate Sopra borders the following municipalities: Albino, Cenate Sotto, Pradalunga, Scanzorosciate, Trescore Balneario.

Demographic evolution

References